Russell Frantom (born October 18, 1991) is an American visual artist based in South Bend, Indiana and Chicago, Illinois. Frantom first gained notoriety and national attention when in 2008, he was arrested and charged with conspiring to form an attack on his then high school Penn High School involving an accomplice located in Cleveland, Ohio. Frantom was only sixteen at the time.

Frantom has gained success regionally as an artist, and has been responsible for creating large art events in his hometown of South Bend, Indiana. Frantom describes himself as an expressionist and completes all of his paintings within hours.

Conspiracy and arrest 

On April 22, 2008, Frantom was arrested after a school resource officer at Penn High School became aware of strange social media posts. The investigation uncovered threatening conversations between Frantom and an Ohio man by the name of Lee Billi. Frantom was charged with conspiracy to commit murder and several illegal and venomous rattlesnakes were removed from his home, along with hundreds of swords and knives.

Art and life

Frantom's art pieces are often very colorful, raw, and sometimes minimal. His most frequently used medium is watercolor. He frequently paints self-portraits and animals.

See also
Mishawaka
List of unsuccessful attacks related to schools

References

External links
Raw Art
Art Listing
Art Event
Mahalo Article
Fine Art America
Cleveland News
Goodwill Painting
The Smoking Gun

1991 births
Living people
Painters from Indiana
American Expressionist painters
People from South Bend, Indiana